The following are the national records in track cycling in Canada maintained by Canada's national cycling federation: Cycling Canada Cyclisme.

Men
Key to tables:

Women

References
General
Canadian Track Cycling Records 12 April 2022 updated
Specific

External links
Cycling Canada Cyclisme web site
Cycling Canada Cyclisme record page

Canada
Track cycling
Track cycling
track cycling